Not for Sale is a 1924 British silent comedy film directed by W. P. Kellino and starring Mary Odette, Ian Hunter and Gladys Hamer. It was made at Cricklewood Studios by Stoll Pictures, and based on a novel by Monica Ewer. The film's sets were designed by the art director Walter Murton. It is still extant, unlike many silent films of the era which are now considered lost.

Plot
After being disinherited by his father due to his extravagant lifestyle, Lord Bering's acquisitive society fiancée breaks off the engagement. He goes to live in a boarding house in Bloomsbury under an assumed name and gets a job as a chauffeur.

His experiences open his eyes to how the other half live, and he befriends Annie Armstrong the owner of the boarding house and her younger brother. When he is wrongly accused of stealing by his employer, he decides to leave London. While hop-picking in Kent he discovers that he has come into a large sum of money. When he proposes to Annie however she misunderstands and tells him that she is "not for sale". However, when Bering falls ill, Annie changes her mind and arranges a reconciliation with his father.

Cast
 Mary Odette as Annie Armstrong
 Ian Hunter as Martin Bering
 Gladys Hamer as Florrie
 Mary Brough as Mrs. Keane
 Lionelle Howard as Bertie Strangeways
 Phyllis Lytton as Virginia Strangeway
 Edward O'Neill as Earl of Rathbury
 Mickey Brantford as John Armstrong
 Julie Kean as Tibbles Armstrong
 W.G. Saunders as Sunny Jim
 Jack Trevor as Desmond North
 Maud Gill as Miss Carter
 Minna Leslie as Mrs. Lovell
 Robert Vallis as Roberts
 Moore Marriott as Solicitor
 George Bellamy as Boarder

References

Bibliography
 Low, Rachael. History of the British Film, 1918-1929. George Allen & Unwin, 1971.

External links

1924 films
1924 comedy films
British comedy films
1920s English-language films
British silent feature films
Films based on British novels
Films directed by W. P. Kellino
Films shot at Cricklewood Studios
Stoll Pictures films
British black-and-white films
Films set in London
Films set in Kent
1920s British films
Silent comedy films